Sydney bus route 333 is a limited-stop bus route operated by Transdev John Holland between Circular Quay and North Bondi. It is Sydney's busiest bus route.

History
State Transit commenced operating in October 2006 as the first full-time prepay only bus route in Sydney.

When Opal cards were rolled out across Sydney, route 333 became the second route to use Opal cards on 6 December 2013.

In September 2018, bus services in the Eastern Suburbs underwent a major overhaul which included timetable changes. As part of changes, overnight services of route 380 were replaced by route 333N which stops at all bus stops between the CBD and North Bondi.  In 2018/19 route 333 was Sydney's busiest bus route. From 24 January 2021, route 333 became a 24-hour service with route 333N withdrawn. In April 2022 it was included in the takeover of Sydney Bus Region 9 by Transdev John Holland.

Current route
Route 333 operates via these primary locations:
Circular Quay
Martin Place
Museum station
Taylor Square
St Vincent's Hospital
Paddington
Bondi Junction
Bondi Beach
North Bondi

References

Bus routes in Sydney